Shyam Mukherjee is an Indian politician and was the Minister for Textiles in the Government of West Bengal till 2016. He is also an MLA, elected from the Bishnupur constituency in the 2011 West Bengal state assembly election.

References 

State cabinet ministers of West Bengal
Living people
West Bengal MLAs 2011–2016
Year of birth missing (living people)